Khaled Mohssen (born 10 January 1998) is a footballer who plays as a midfielder for  club Ansar.

Born in Germany, Mohssen is of Lebanese descent; he played one game for the Lebanon national team in 2020.

Club career

Hamburger SV 
Mohssen represented Hamburger SV at under-15, under-17, and under-19 levels. He made 59 appearances in the Under 19 Bundesliga, scoring six goals and providing four assists. Mohssen also captained the reserve team, Regionalliga side Hamburger SV II, scoring five goals in 52 games.

Phönix Lübeck 
On 30 September 2020, Mohssen moved to newly-promoted Regionalliga side Phönix Lübeck on a free transfer. Due to the COVID-19 pandemic, the league was suspended in November 2020, with Mohssen only playing one league game; he left the club following the expiration of his contract in summer 2021.

Ansar 
Mohssen joined Lebanese Premier League side Ansar on 27 November 2021.

International career 
Born in Germany, Mohssen is of Lebanese descent. He made his debut for the Lebanon national team in a 3–1 friendly defeat to Bahrain on 12 November 2020.

Career statistics

Club

International

Honours 
Ansar
 Lebanese FA Cup runner-up: 2021–22
 Lebanese Elite Cup runner-up: 2022

See also 
 List of Lebanon international footballers born outside Lebanon

References

External links
 
 

1998 births
Living people
Footballers from Hamburg
German people of Lebanese descent
Sportspeople of Lebanese descent
Lebanese footballers
German footballers
Association football midfielders
Hamburger SV players
Hamburger SV II players
1. FC Phönix Lübeck players
Al Ansar FC players
Regionalliga players
Lebanese Premier League players
Lebanon international footballers